James O'Neal may refer to:

James O'Neal, pen name of James O. Born, American novelist
James Oneal  (1875–1962), founding member of the Socialist Party of America
James O'Neal, American mariner, captain of City of St. Louis; see Anchor Line (riverboat company)

See also
James O'Neill (disambiguation)
James O'Neil (disambiguation)
Jimmy O'Neill (disambiguation)
Jim O'Neill (disambiguation)
James Neal (disambiguation)